The Lyceum Theatre is a Broadway theater at 149 West 45th Street, between Seventh Avenue and Sixth Avenue, in the Theater District of Midtown Manhattan in New York City. Opened in 1903, the Lyceum Theatre is one of the oldest surviving Broadway venues, as well as the oldest continuously operating legitimate theater in New York City. The theater was designed by Herts & Tallant in the Beaux-Arts style and was built for impresario Daniel Frohman. It has 922 seats across three levels and is operated by The Shubert Organization. The facade became a New York City designated landmark in 1974, and the lobby and auditorium interiors were similarly designated in 1987.

The theater maintains most of its original Beaux-Arts design. Its 45th Street facade has an undulating glass-and-metal marquee shielding the entrances, as well as a colonnade with three arched windows. The lobby has a groin-vaulted ceiling, murals above the entrances, and staircases to the auditorium's balcony levels. The auditorium has an ornately decorated proscenium and boxes, but the ceiling and walls are relatively plain. An apartment above the lobby, originally used by Frohman, was converted to the headquarters of the Shubert Archives in 1986. The stage door entrance is through 152 West 46th Street, a 10-story wing designed by Herts & Tallant, which also houses the dressing rooms and some backstage facilities.

The current Lyceum replaced Frohman's earlier Lyceum on Fourth Avenue, which closed in 1902. The current theater opened on November 2, 1903, with the play The Proud Prince. Frohman's brother Charles served as the theater's manager until dying in 1915, and Daniel Frohman subsequently partnered with David Belasco to show productions at the theater until 1930. Afterward, Frohman lost the theater to foreclosure in the Great Depression, and a syndicate composed of George S. Kaufman, Max Gordon, and Moss Hart bought the theater in 1940. The Shubert Organization has operated the theater since 1950. The Lyceum was leased to the Association of Producing Artists (APA) and Phoenix Theatre in the late 1960s and to the National Actors Theatre during much of the 1990s.

Site 
The Lyceum Theatre is on 149 West 45th Street, between Seventh Avenue and Sixth Avenue near Times Square, in the Theater District of Midtown Manhattan in New York City. These lots formerly contained houses. On the same block, 1540 Broadway is to the west and Americas Tower and High School of Performing Arts are to the east. Other nearby buildings include the Church of St. Mary the Virgin to the northeast; the Palace Theatre, Embassy Theatre, and I. Miller Building to the north; the Millennium Times Square New York and Hudson Theatre to the south; and the Hotel Gerard and Belasco Theatre to the southeast.

Design
The Lyceum Theatre was designed by Herts & Tallant in the Beaux-Arts style and constructed from 1902 to 1903 for impresario Daniel Frohman. Operated by the Shubert Organization, it is the oldest continuously operating legitimate theater in New York City.

Facade

45th Street 
The primary elevation of the facade is on 45th Street and is made of limestone. A promotional brochure from the theater's opening in 1903 said that the facade "recalls in its style and amplitude the best period of Roman art". The street-level facade is made of rusticated blocks of limestone. Three large archways lead into the lobby; their doors are made of painted wood and contain arched panels of glass. The street level entrances are shielded by a sinuous marquee canopy made of iron and glass. When the theater opened, the entrance had a self-supporting canopy that could shield either five or eight carriages unloading their passengers. In 1986, the canopy was replaced with a replica that was cantilevered from the facade with metal rods. The modern canopy has moldings of pressed metal, medallions above each archway, and glass panels hanging underneath the canopy. The design of the Lyceum's canopy was subsequently replicated by that of the Paramount Theatre. Above the entrance, the 45th Street elevation contains a colonnade of three bays. The bays are delineated by a pair of neoclassical fluted columns at each end, as well as two single columns in the center. Each bay contains fluting, bands with foliate ornament, and ornate capitals. Within each bay is a French window with a three-centered arched surround. A frieze runs above the windows, containing six stone faces that signify both comedy and tragedy. An entablature runs above the columns. The three bays are flanked by a pair of outer pavilions that have no ornament at all. The colonnade and marquee were particularly intended to attract a "more cultured audience" than similar theaters.

The theater contains a mansard roof above the entablature. The mansard roof contains three windows within triangular pediments, which illuminate a penthouse in the roof. A balustrade, directly on top of the entablature, encloses a balcony at the penthouse level. There are also six oval windows above the penthouse, which illuminate a former rehearsal hall. The roof also had four large urns that emitted gas at night. The urns were used to draw attention to the theater, since it was on a side street north of the other theaters of the time. At the theater's construction in 1903, the roof was described as being of "purple slate" with a bronze statue. The Lyceum's roof had two water towers, collectively capable of storing .

46th Street 
The stage door entrance is through the wing on 152 West 46th Street. Herts & Tallant designed the 46th Street wing with ten or eleven stories. The wing has a utilitarian design and contains vestiges of a slit that carried backdrops between the stage and the upper-story studios.

Interior 
Frohman had offices on the upper portion of the main 45th Street structure, while the rear annex on 46th Street contained auxiliary facilities such as storage and dressing rooms. The color scheme of the interior was compared in contemporary media to autumn foliage, with a range of hues from "deep yellow to warm red and brown". From the outset, the auditorium was designed to use electric lighting exclusively. A switchboard controlled the stage lighting, which could be controlled to be as bright as natural illumination. The theater was also mechanically advanced for its time, with heating, cooling, and ventilation systems, as well as a fireproof structural frame. The air-intake system consisted of blowers that drew air from the chimneys and passed the air through a porcelain duct, a set of silk filters, and water sprayers. The auditorium floor had "mushrooms" for air intake and outflow. The heating and ventilation system could change the auditorium's air every six minutes.

Lobby 

The entrance lobby is a rectangular space, with elliptical arches on the north and south walls. The lobby floor is made of marble from Maryland, which was designed to resemble Athenian marble. The floor is made of marble mosaic tiles. The center of the floor has a panel with the theater's motif, a decorative letter "L" with foliate ornament around it. The walls contain a marble dado wrapping around the lobby, as well as piers topped by capitals with acanthus leaves. There are foliate moldings around each of the elliptical arches. The walls also have lighting sconces. The lobby's ceiling consists of a groin vault with a molded egg-and-dart border and decorative rosettes in the vault's ribs. There is a dome at the middle of the ceiling, with an egg-and-dart border, a hanging chandelier, and cove lights.

The south doors lead to the street, while the north doors lead to the auditorium. Above the north and south walls are canvas murals by James Wall Finn. The murals depict female figures on either side of portraits of Sarah Siddons and David Garrick. Above the center door on the north wall is a segmentally-arched pediment, supported on console brackets flanking the doorway; these pediments contain the "L" motif.

To the west and east are curving stairs leading up to the first balcony level. The staircases are covered in marble but are actually made of steel. The outer walls of the staircases contain marble dados, as well as bronze railings attached to them. The inside edges of the staircases have bronze balustrades with cast-iron and wrought-iron decorations, as well as newel posts containing nude figures. The east wall also has ticket windows. Another stair to the west leads down to the smoking room. At the balcony level was a foyer and smoking rooms.

Auditorium 

The auditorium has an orchestra level, boxes, two balconies, and a stage behind the proscenium arch. The auditorium's width is greater than its depth, and the space is designed with plaster decorations in high relief. The Lyceum's auditorium generally has plain plaster walls, and much of the decoration is concentrated on the proscenium and boxes. The juxtaposition of plain walls and ornamented openings was intended to draw the audience's attention toward the stage.

The auditorium has 922 seats, making the Lyceum one of the smaller Broadway theaters. These are divided into 409 seats in the orchestra, 287 on the first balcony, and 210 on the second balcony, as well as 16 box seats. As designed, the seats were upholstered in dark yellow leather, which has since been replaced. The large width of the auditorium compensated for the relatively small number of rows.

Seating areas
The rear (south) end of the orchestra contains a shallow promenade, which has wood-paneled walls, arched "L" motifs, and cartouches. The orchestra has a raked floor and painted wood paneling on the side walls. Above the paneling are ornamented pediments with foliate and egg-and-dart decorations. The orchestra level is wheelchair-accessible via the main doors, but the balcony levels can only be accessed by steps. Unusually for theaters of the time, the balconies are cantilevered from the structural framework, which obviated the need for columns that blocked audience views. The balcony levels have paneled wooden dados on both the side and rear walls; the first balcony has blind openings and cartouches. The balconies have foliate bands on their undersides, with light fixtures underneath. In front of the balconies are leaf moldings topped by brackets and foliate decoration. All three levels have sconces on the side walls.

On either side of the stage is a wall section with one box at the first balcony level. Each wall section consists of Ionic-style fluted and banded columns, which support an elliptical arch. The boxes themselves are supported on large brackets, which in turn rest above piers with foliate capitals. In front of each box is a curved railing with leaf moldings. There is a cartouche with an "L" motif atop the boxes' arches, and a swag shaped like a leaf is suspended from the cartouche.

Other design features

The proscenium arch consists of a wide, molded band with foliate and egg-and-dart decorations. Above the center of the arch is a console bracket with swags, above which is a broken pediment, as well as a pair of swag-filled console brackets on either side of the pediment. The broken pediment has a figure of Pallas Athene, which is flanked by female representations of drama and music. These figures were also carved by J. W. Finn. 

The lift, no longer operational, divided the stage into several sections. It could be used not only to raise and lower scenery, but also to create sets with terrain elements, such as cliffs, terraces, and rivers.

The coved ceiling is distinguished by console brackets with swags, and there are decorations of bellflowers within the cove. The ceiling is divided into ribs, containing bands with fruits and flowers. The center of the ceiling contains a rectangular panel with modillions around it, as well as floral cartouches and latticework inside. Around this panel are circular "L" motifs. Guilloche moldings hang over the second balcony. The ceiling lacked a chandelier, as the designers thought it would be distracting to the performers and audience. Instead, there are recessed light fixtures in the ceiling.

Other facilities 
Daniel Frohman's "penthouse", comprising his office and apartment, was on the south side of the theater building, facing 45th Street. It was not part of his original plans but became his primary residence, though he also had another residence in New York City. They were accessed by a stair and elevator from the lobby. Frohman's offices contained Chippendale furniture as well as a reproduction of playwright David Garrick's library. The adjacent rooms contained stenographers' offices and other rooms. A small window from his dining room's northern wall allowed Frohman to look at the performances in the auditorium. During the mid-1920s, The New York Times described Frohman's office as, "in a manner, the headquarters of the theatrical profession in the city". The office contained portraits of numerous oil paintings, drawings, photographs, and lithographs of show personalities. Frohman's office also had a phone line for contacting the stage manager directly.

Frohman's offices were subsequently converted into the Shubert Archive, which contains the Shubert Organization's theatrical collection. The archive was organized in 1976 and opened at the Lyceum in 1986. Initially, it contained four million items from the Shuberts' history between 1900 and World War II, including 2,000 costume designs, 8,000 blueprints, and 12,000 manuscripts. There is also some space inside the mansard roof. Originally, this space included a large rehearsal room with its own stage, directly above the main auditorium.

The 46th Street annex housed the scene-painting studio, a carpenter shop, a costume department, and storage spaces, as well as dressing rooms. The scene-painting studio faced the street, with natural light coming from the north, and could be used to paint up to four backdrops at a time. The carpentry shop could accommodate 25 workers. The costume department was housed in a separate room that could fit 50 seamstresses and a varying number of cutters. The storage spaces included a full storage warehouse as well as rooms to store scenery. According to contemporary media, the dressing rooms could fit 200 people. Each dressing room had a bathroom, and there were large rooms for supernumerary actors as well. The old scenery rooms have also become part of the Shubert Archive and contain artifacts such as librettos, orchestrations, and cash books.

History 
Times Square became the epicenter for large-scale theater productions between 1900 and the Great Depression. Manhattan's theater district had begun to shift from Union Square and Madison Square during the first decade of the 20th century. These venues were developed following the construction of the Empire Theatre on 41st Street in 1893 and Hammerstein's Olympia in 1895. The Lyceum, Hudson, and New Amsterdam, which all opened in 1903, were among the first theaters to make this shift; the Lyceum is one of the oldest surviving Broadway theaters. From 1901 to 1920, forty-three theaters were built around Broadway in Midtown Manhattan, including the current Lyceum.

Development 

Daniel Frohman had operated an earlier Lyceum Theatre on Fourth Avenue, near Madison Square, which had been built in 1885 by Steele MacKaye. Metropolitan Life acquired the old Lyceum in 1902 to make way for the Metropolitan Life Insurance Company Tower. In February 1902, shortly after the old Lyceum was acquired, Frohman announced he had purchased six lots on 45th and 46th Streets near Times Square. He planned to build a 900-seat theater on the site after the leases on the lots expired. The auditorium would be on 45th Street, while a narrow wing with mechanical equipment and dressing rooms would be placed on 46th Street. Frohman hired Herts & Tallant to design the new theater, while the Fuller Construction Company was hired as the general contractor.

The old Lyceum ultimately closed on March 22, 1902. Work on the new theater began on April 1, a week after the old Lyceum was closed. The cornerstone was laid on October 16, 1902, upon which thirteen of the old Lyceum's bricks were placed into the new theater. By then, the basement and cellar were largely complete and the theater was to be completed early the following year. The theater was supposed to open in September 1903 but encountered so many delays that the inaugural play, The Proud Prince, could only be scheduled at the Lyceum for two weeks. Daniel Frohman, his brother Charles Frohman, and William Harris formed the New Lyceum Theatre Company and divided ownership of the Lyceum equally. Instead of distributing stock, the company issued six promissory notes of $118,328 each, which could not be collected for as long as each partner lived.

Frohman operation

Early years 
The new Lyceum Theatre (also formally capitalized as the New Lyceum Theatre) opened on November 2, 1903, with The Proud Prince. E. H. Sothern, who starred in The Proud Prince, had also appeared in the first production that Frohman had shown at the old Lyceum. At the theater's opening, an architectural publication praised the theater's design as "being intended for a high-class dramatic performance before a refined and cultured audience". Conversely, because of its relatively remote location, the New-York Tribune said that there were "many who refused to believe that a theater so far up town would be successful". Charles Frohman was the theater's first manager. From its inception, the new Lyceum was intended as a venue for "drawing-room comedies".

Three weeks after the theater's opening, The Admirable Crichton premiered at the new Lyceum. The play The Other Girl and Granny appeared at the Lyceum in 1904, as did Mrs. Leffingwell's Boots and A Doll's House in 1905. The most successful production in the Lyceum's initial years was the drama The Lion and the Mouse, which opened in 1905 and ran for 686 performances. Daniel Frohman's wife Margaret Illington appeared at some productions in the Lyceum. beginning with Mrs. Leffingwell's Boots and The Thief (1907). Frohman would gesture through the window from his office to signify when Illington was overacting. Actresses such as Ethel Barrymore, Billie Burke, Ina Claire, and Lenore Ulric also performed at the Lyceum in its early years. Burke starred or co-starred in some plays during the Lyceum's first decade, including Love Watches in 1908, Mrs. Dot and Suzanne in 1910, and The Runaway in 1911. The Lyceum also hosted the U.S. premiere of the French silent film The Loves of Queen Elizabeth, featuring Sarah Bernhardt, in 1912. Barrymore, meanwhile, was featured in Our Mrs. McChesney (1915).

Belasco partnership 

Charles Frohman died in May 1915 during the sinking of the RMS Lusitania, and his company, which had an ownership stake in the Lyceum, was subsequently acquired by Paramount Pictures. David Belasco announced in March 1916 that he would become one of the managers of the Lyceum Theatre. Contemporary media said the move was borne out of sentimental considerations, as Belasco had frequently collaborated with Charles Frohman. Among the major productions at the Lyceum in the late 1910s were Tiger Rose (1917), featuring Lenore Ulric; Daddies (1918), featuring Jeanne Eagels and George Abbott; and The Gold Diggers (1919), featuring Ina Claire. These shows all had several hundred performances, including The Gold Diggers, which had 720 performances. In addition, the theater held events such as a charity dinner for the Actors' National Memorial Fund in 1919. Frohman administered the Actors' Fund from his office.

The Lyceum hosted many romantic comedies and other successful productions in the 1920s. Frohman leased the theater to Famous Players-Lasky, which was to present Belasco's works there for ten years starting in October 1921. The same year, the theater hosted The Easiest Way with Frances Starr, as well as The Grand Duke with Lionel Atwill and Lina Abarbanell. The Lyceum's stage and decorations were restored in 1922, prior to the opening of Shore Leave, which featured Starr and James Rennie. The Lyceum also hosted revivals of classical plays, including The Merchant of Venice (1922), The School for Scandal (1923), and Antony and Cleopatra (1924). During 1925, the theater hosted The Grand Duchess and the Waiter, with Elsie Ferguson and Basil Rathbone, and the romantic comedy Naughty Cinderella, with Irène Bordoni.

In the late 1920s, the Lyceum hosted productions such as the comedy Fanny (1926) with Fanny Brice and Elmer the Great (1928) with Walter Huston.  The decade ended with the 1929 romance Berkeley Square, which had over 200 performances. Frohman and Belasco's partnership ended when Belasco died in May 1931 after a long illness. The lease on the theater was set to expire later that year, and Frohman planned to rent the Lyceum as an independent playhouse. By then, Frohman was no longer an active producer.

Great Depression and ownership changes 

The Lyceum Theatre suffered in general because of the Great Depression, and most shows generally closed after a small number of performances. Among the longer productions was Payment Deferred (1931), which had 70 performances, as well as Sailor, Beware! (1933), which had 500 performances. In 1934, the theater hosted Ode to Liberty, featuring Ina Claire. The Bowery Savings Bank moved to foreclose on a mortgage loan on the theater in mid-1935. Later that year, the Lyceum was leased for one year to Julius Stone for a presentation of Squaring the Circle. The next year, Frohman leased most of the theater, except for his own offices, to Spencer D. Bettelheim of the Lyco Company for five years. Contemporary newspapers said the lease to Bettelheim was "a sentimental gesture", since Bettelheim's father was Frohman's old friend. Bettelheim then announced a renovation of the interior, including new seats.

Long-running productions during the late 1930s included Pre-Honeymoon (1936) with Jessie Royce Landis; St. Helena (1936) with Maurice Evans; and Having Wonderful Time (1937) with John Garfield and Katherine Locke. The theater was less financially stable after the Lyco Company dissolved in 1938. By March 1939, the Bowery Savings Bank was foreclosing on the Lyceum, which was in danger of demolition. After Stanley Howe, a friend of Frohman's and an aide to mayor Fiorello La Guardia, intervened, the bank promised that Frohman could stay in his apartment for the rest of his life. The Lyceum was leased to Victor Payne-Jennings that April, on the condition that Frohman be allowed to keep his residence. The Bowery Savings Bank acquired the theater at a foreclosure auction in December 1939 for $100,000. Shortly afterward, Samuel Briskman leased the theater and used it to show When We Are Married.

In May 1940, the Bowery Savings Bank announced it would sell the Lyceum to a syndicate that included playwright George S. Kaufman, producer Max Gordon, and playwright Moss Hart for $250,000. Frohman was to be allowed to live in the apartment above the theater for $1 per year, though Frohman died in December 1940, less than a year afterward. Among the syndicate's first works at the Lyceum was George Washington Slept Here in 1940, as well as The Beautiful People and Junior Miss in 1941. This was followed by The Doughgirls, which had 671 performances, and The Late George Apley, which had 384 performances. The Lyceum then hosted Born Yesterday, which opened in 1946 and was the theater's longest-running production with 1,642 performances. Born Yesterday was transferred out of the Lyceum mid-run in 1948 and was followed by "a half-dozen flops".

The Gordon syndicate agreed to sell the Lyceum to Harry Gould in April 1949 for $400,000, after having previously failed to sell the theater to Gould at twice that price. The sale was not finalized until that December, when the price had increased to $450,000. The first major production in the 1950s was the original The Country Girl, which opened in 1950. Melvyn Douglas then appeared in two successful comedies: Glad Tidings in 1951 and Time Out for Ginger in 1952.

Shubert operation

1950s to 1970s 
The New York Times reported in 1952 that the Shubert Organization had taken over the Lyceum. During 1954, the theater hosted the comedy King of Hearts and the romance drama Anastasia, both of which ran for over 200 performances. This was followed by A Hatful of Rain (1955), The Happiest Millionaire (1956), and Look Back in Anger (1957). Notable productions of the late 1950s also included The Gazebo in 1958 and The Billy Barnes Revue in 1959. Subsequently, the Lyceum showed the British dramas A Taste of Honey in 1960 and The Caretaker in 1961. The Lyceum then had several short-lived works before showing Nobody Loves an Albatross in 1963.

The Association of Producing Artists (APA) and Phoenix Theatre showed their productions at the Lyceum from 1965 to 1969. In March 1965, the Shuberts leased the theater to the partnership of APA and Phoenix for $100,000 a year, which the lessees considered a nominal fee. The APA and Phoenix originally did not have enough money to transfer their works to the Lyceum for the 1965–1966 season, but ultimately it opened a revival of the play You Can't Take It with You at the Lyceum in November 1965. During the APA-Phoenix era, the Lyceum hosted classical revivals such as War and Peace, The Show-Off, The Cherry Orchard, The Cocktail Party, The Misanthrope, and Hamlet. The Lyceum also operated as a repertory theatre for films in mid-1968. The APA and Phoenix dissolved their partnership in early 1969 due to a lack of funding. Afterward, the theater hosted plays such as Three Men on a Horse.

There were few successful productions at the Lyceum during the 1970s, amid a decline in the Broadway theatrical industry. Among the longer runs in this era were the 1970 play Borstal Boy and the 1976 play Your Arms Too Short to Box with God. Phoenix also hosted some of its works at the Lyceum. During the early 1970s, Daniel Frohman's niece-in-law petitioned the New York City Landmarks Preservation Commission (LPC) to protect the Lyceum as a city landmark. The LPC designated the theater's facade, but not its interior, as an official city landmark in 1974, requiring the LPC to review and approve all proposed modifications to the facade. Gerald Schoenfeld of the Shubert Organization had opposed the landmark status, believing the small theater to be a liability. A landmark plaque was installed on the facade in 1978. Major productions during the late 1970s included Cold Storage in 1977 and Wings in 1979.

1980s and 1990s 
The Lyceum hosted a revival of Morning's at Seven in 1980. The theater then hosted productions such as "Master Harold"...and the Boys (1982), The Man Who Had Three Arms (1983), a set of monologues by comedian Whoopi Goldberg in 1984, and As Is (1985) The LPC gave the Shuberts permission to replace the facade marquee in 1986 after the original marquee began to fall apart. According to Schoenfeld, the Shuberts had to pay $350,000 to replace the marquee due to the commission's demands, though the highest bid was only about $150,000 and the theater was often unoccupied. The Shubert Archive also opened in 1986. In the dozen years after 1987, the Lyceum was idle for about 70 percent of the time. To increase the occupancy of the Lyceum and other little-used Broadway theaters, the League of American Theaters and Producers negotiated with Broadway unions and guilds during the late 1980s. Among the shows of the late 1980s were the 1986 puppet show A Little Like Magic, as well as Safe Sex (1987) and Our Town (1988). During the 1980s, the Shuberts renovated the Lyceum as part of a restoration program for their Broadway theaters. 

After the Lyceum's facade was successfully designated as a landmark, the LPC started considering a similar protection for the interior in 1982, with discussions continuing over the next several years. The Lyceum was designated as an interior landmark on December 8, 1987. This was part of the LPC's wide-ranging effort in 1987 to grant landmark status to Broadway theaters. The New York City Board of Estimate ratified the designations in March 1988. The Shuberts, the Nederlanders, and Jujamcyn collectively sued the LPC in June 1988 to overturn the landmark designations of 22 theaters, including the Lyceum's interior, on the merit that the designations severely limited the extent to which the theaters could be modified. The lawsuit was escalated to the New York Supreme Court and the Supreme Court of the United States, but these designations were ultimately upheld in 1992.

The National Actors Theatre, led by Tony Randall, announced in 1992 that it would relocate from the Belasco to the Lyceum, despite the smaller size of the latter. The Lyceum was used by the National Actors Theatre for most of the 1990s, but most of its productions were unsuccessful. The first season of the National Actors Theatre opened with performances of The Seagull, Saint Joan, and Three Men on a Horse. The National Actors Theatre went on to host Timon of Athens, The Government Inspector, and The Flowering Peach in 1994; Gentlemen Prefer Blondes and The School for Scandal in 1995; and The Gin Game and The Sunshine Boys in 1997. Additionally, the actor Mandy Patinkin performed a limited engagement at the Lyceum in March 1997. The National Actors Theatre closed out the 1990s with the plays Night Must Fall and The Lonesome West in 1999.

During the late 1980s, the Shubert Organization had leased  of the site's unused air development rights. German firm Bertelsmann used the air rights to increase the height of the adjacent skyscraper at 1540 Broadway. The Shuberts had to maintain the Lyceum as a legitimate theater as part of the agreement concerning the theater's air rights, and Bertelsmann had an option to buy the theater. In 1999, there was a dispute over whether Spirit of Broadway, a theatrical museum with a 60-minute play targeted at tourists, should be produced at the Lyceum. Bertelsmann supported Spirit of Broadway, but Schoenfeld said it did not fall under the criteria for legitimate shows. Though Spirit of Broadway was ultimately determined to be legitimate, the Shuberts terminated Bertelsmann's option on the theater in 2001.

2000s to present 

After the National Actors Theatre stopped producing at the Lyceum, the theater hosted Rose in 2000, a solo play with Olympia Dukakis. Subsequently, the Lyceum hosted productions such as The Invention of Love in 2001, The Play What I Wrote and I Am My Own Wife in 2003, and The Lieutenant of Inishmore in 2006. As part of a settlement with the United States Department of Justice in 2003, the Shuberts agreed to improve disabled access at their 16 landmarked Broadway theaters, including the Lyceum. The roof and 45th Street facade were repaired in 2005 as part of a $1 million renovation. During the late 2000s, the Lyceum hosted plays and musicals such as Inherit the Wind, Is He Dead?, Macbeth, title of show, Reasons to Be Pretty, and In the Next Room (or The Vibrator Play).

The Lyceum Theatre hosted numerous shows in the 2010s as well. These included Looped, The Scottsboro Boys, Venus in Fur, The Nance, The Realistic Joneses, Disgraced, The Visit, A View from the Bridge, Fully Committed, Oh, Hello, The Play That Goes Wrong, Be More Chill, and A Christmas Carol. In addition, the NBC television series Smash used the theater in 2012 as the home of their fictional musical Bombshell. The theater closed on March 12, 2020, due to the COVID-19 pandemic. It reopened on October 11, 2021, with Is This A Room and Dana H. playing in repertory. These were followed in early 2022 by A Strange Loop, which ran until January 2023.

Notable productions
Productions are listed by the year of their first performance.

1900s to 1990s

 1903: The Admirable Crichton
 1904: David Garrick
 1905: A Doll's House
 1907: The Truth
 1909: 
 1909: Penelope
 1910: The Pillars of Society
 1910: The Assumption of Hannele
 1910: The Importance of Being Earnest
 1913: The Ghost Breaker
 1915: John Gabriel Borkman
 1917: The Great Divide
 1917: The Case of Lady Camber
 1919: The Gold Diggers
 1922: The Merchant of Venice
 1923: The School for Scandal
 1924: Antony and Cleopatra
 1926: The Sport of Kings
 1929: Berkeley Square
 1931: Anatol
 1935: Squaring the Circle
 1936: St. Helena
 1939: The Mother
 1939: When We Are Married
 1941: Junior Miss
 1942: The Doughgirls
 1946: Born Yesterday
 1950: The Enchanted
 1950: The Country Girl
 1952: Anna Christie
 1952: Time Out For Ginger
 1955: A Hatful of Rain
 1957: Look Back in Anger
 1958: The Gazebo
 1959: The Billy Barnes Revue
 1959: Flowering Cherry
 1959: Goodbye Charlie
 1960: A Taste of Honey
 1960: The Importance of Being Oscar
 1960: Mandingo
 1961: The Caretaker
 1963: Ages of Man
 1963: Nobody Loves an Albatross
 1965: Entertaining Mr. Sloane
 1965, 1967: You Can't Take It With You
 1966: The School for Scandal
 1967: The Wild Duck
 1967: By George
 1967, 1968: The Show-off
 1968: Exit the King
 1968: The Cherry Orchard
 1968: The Cocktail Party
 1968: The Misanthrope
 1969: Cock-a-Doodle Dandy
 1969: Hamlet
 1969: Three Men on a Horse
 1970: Norman, Is That You?
 1970: Borstal Boy
 1971: The School for Wives
 1972: The Great God Brown and Don Juan
 1973: Out Cry
 1975: The Lieutenant
 1976: Something's Afoot
 1976: Best Friend
 1976: Your Arms Too Short to Box with God
 1979: Wings
 1980: Morning's at Seven
 1982: "Master Harold"...and the Boys
 1983: The Man Who Had Three Arms
 1985: As Is
 1988: Our Town
 1993: Saint Joan
 1993: Three Men on a Horse
 1993: Timon of Athens
 1994: The Government Inspector
 1994: The Flowering Peach
 1995: Gentlemen Prefer Blondes
 1995: The School for Scandal
 1997: The Gin Game
 1997: The Sunshine Boys
 1999: Night Must Fall
 1999: The Lonesome West

2000s to present

 2001: The Invention of Love
 2002: Morning's at Seven
 2003: The Play What I Wrote
 2003: I Am My Own Wife
 2005: Steel Magnolias
 2006: The Lieutenant of Inishmore
 2007: Inherit the Wind
 2007: Is He Dead?
 2008: Macbeth
 2008: title of show
 2009: Reasons to Be Pretty
 2009: In the Next Room (or The Vibrator Play)
 2010: Looped
 2010: The Scottsboro Boys
 2012: Venus in Fur
 2013: The Nance
 2014: The Realistic Joneses
 2014: Disgraced
 2015: The Visit
 2015: A View from the Bridge
 2016: Fully Committed
 2016: Oh, Hello
 2017: The Play That Goes Wrong
 2019: Be More Chill
 2019: A Christmas Carol
 2021: Is This a Room and Dana H.
 2022: A Strange Loop

See also

 List of Broadway theaters
 List of New York City Designated Landmarks in Manhattan from 14th to 59th Streets

References

Notes

Citations

Sources

External links

 
 
 Lyceum Theatre, Playbill

1903 establishments in New York City
Broadway theatres
New York City Designated Landmarks in Manhattan
New York City interior landmarks
Theater District, Manhattan
Theatres completed in 1903